Úsmev is the fourth compilation of greatest hits by Modus, released on Bonton in 1998.

Track listing

Official releases
 1998: Úsmev, CD, Bonton, #491 722

Credits and personnel

 Ján Lehotský - lead vocal, writer, keyboards
 Marika Gombitová - lead vocal, back vocal
 Miroslav Žbirka - writer, lead vocal, chorus, guitar
 Ľudovít Nosko - lead vocal
 Miroslav Jevčák - lead vocal
 Eugen Kratochvíla - writer

 Daniela Hivešová - lyrics
 Kamil Peteraj - lyrics
 Boris Filan - lyrics
 Ľuboš Zeman - lyrics
 Alexander Karšay - lyrics
 Ján Štrasser - lyrics

See also
 The 100 Greatest Slovak Albums of All Time

Footnotes

References

General

Specific

External links 
 
 
 

1998 compilation albums
Modus (band) compilation albums